Hanaki Dam is a rockfill dam located in Aomori Prefecture in Japan. The dam is used for flood control. The catchment area of the dam is 18.5 km2. The dam impounds about 8  ha of land when full and can store 576 thousand cubic meters of water. The construction of the dam was started on 1966 and completed in 1972.

References

Dams in Aomori Prefecture
1972 establishments in Japan